Unison is a shareware Mac OS X client for Usenet, developed by Panic Software. It requires access to a news server and supports binary file downloading (including NZB support), group browsing and segmenting and error checking utilities. The software won the Apple Design Award for Best Mac OS X User experience in 2004, as well as being a runner-up in the "Best product" category.

On 6 November 2014 Panic Software announced, with the release of version 2.2, that all further work on Unison had been discontinued. Unison is still available for download and no longer requires a purchased license; however, it is unsupported by Panic.

See also
Panic
List of Usenet newsreaders
Comparison of Usenet newsreaders

External links
Unison website
Panic website

References 

MacOS-only software
Usenet clients
Panic software